WLJI, known as "Gospel 98.3", is a full-time urban contemporary gospel station located in the Midlands region of South Carolina. WLJI is licensed to Summerton, a small town located near Sumter on 98.3 FM. WLJI broadcasts with 16 kW.

History
On March 24, 1997 WLJI signed on the air as a full-time simulcast of WFMV.

References

External links

Radio stations established in 1997
Gospel radio stations in the United States
1997 establishments in South Carolina
LJI